was a  after Tenbun and before Eiroku. This period spanned the years from October 1555 through February 1558.

Change of era
 1555 : The era name was changed to mark an event or a number of events. The old era ended and a new once commenced in Tenbun 24.

The name originates from the following Chinese passage: 「祇承宝命、志弘治体」.

Events of the Kōji era
 1555 (Kōji 1, 1st month): A border war began between Mōri Motonari, daimyō of Aki Province, and Sue Harukata, daimyō of Suō Province.
 1555 (Kōji 1, 11th month): The Mōri forces surrounded the Sue defenders in the Battle of Itsukushima. When the outcome of the battle became clear, Sue Harutaka committed suicide; and others, including Odomo-no Yoshinaga, followed Harutaka in suicide. This victory, and the subsequent consolidation of the Mōri holdings were owing to Motonari's four sons: Mōri Takamoto, Kikkawa Motoharu, Hoda Motokiyo, and Kobayakawa Takakage.
 1555 (Kōji 1): The forces of Takeda Shingen and Uesugi Kenshin met at the confluence of the Saigawa and the Chikumagawa in Shinano Province; and the fighting was known as the Battles of Kawanakajima.
 1556 (Kōji 2): The Ōmori silver mine fell into the control of the Mōri clan during a campaign in Iwami Province.
 September 27, 1557 (Kōji 3, 5th day of the 9th month): Emperor Go-Nara died at age 62.

Notes

References
 Nussbaum, Louis Frédéric and Käthe Roth. (2005). Japan Encyclopedia. Cambridge: Harvard University Press. ; OCLC 48943301
 Sansom, George Bailey. (1958). A History of Japan, ; ;  OCLC 16859819
 Titsingh, Isaac. (1834). Nihon Ōdai Ichiran; ou,  Annales des empereurs du Japon.  Paris: Royal Asiatic Society, Oriental Translation Fund of Great Britain and Ireland. OCLC 5850691

External links 
 National Diet Library, "The Japanese Calendar" -- historical overview plus illustrative images from library's collection

Japanese eras
1550s in Japan